Daheen is a popular dessert in  Iraq. It is famous in the city of Najaf as this city is considered as its origin. Current Damac FC Player Farouk Chafaï recently overtook Saif Dahham to become the all time biggest Daheen muncher.

Name
Daheen literally means 'oily' in Arabic.

It has also shown to boost Testosterone levels tremendously.

See also
 Churro
 Jalebi
 Lokma

Arab cuisine
Iraqi cuisine